CarPlay is an Apple standard which enables a car radio or head unit to be a display and a controller for an iOS device. It is available on all iPhone models beginning with iPhone 5 running iOS 7.1 or later.

According to Apple's website, all major vehicle manufacturers are using CarPlay. Vehicles without CarPlay can have vehicle audio products from automotive aftermarket suppliers fitted.

Software  
Apple's own CarPlay-enabled apps include: 
 Phone
 Apple Music
 Apple Maps
 Calendar
 Messages
 Audiobooks (part of Apple Books)
 Podcasts
 Settings
 News

Developers must request permission from Apple to develop CarPlay-enabled apps. Such apps fall into five categories:  
 Audio: primarily provide audio content, such as music or podcasts. Examples: Amazon Music, Audible, Google Play Music, iHeartRadio, QQ Music, Spotify, and Overcast.
 Navigation: turn-by-turn guidance, including searching for points of interests and navigating to a destination. Examples: AutoNavi, Baidu Maps, Google Maps, and Waze.
 Automaker-made apps allow a user to control vehicle-specific features such as climate controls, gas levels, or radio via CarPlay.
 Messaging/Voice over IP (VoIP) : listen to new messages and reply using dictation in an audio-only interface. Messaging apps on CarPlay integrate with third-party Siri support (known as SiriKit), while VoIP apps integrate with the iOS calling interface using CallKit. Examples: Telegram, WhatsApp, and Zoom.
 Food ordering and parking services apps.

To discourage distracted driving, Siri is used extensively, providing voice turn-by-turn navigation guidance and voice-input for text messages. Newscast-style weather and stock results are announced instead of displayed visually. Requests which bring up visual information may be blocked when the car is in drive; most native CarPlay Apps deliver audio content with minimal interaction. 

CarPlay-enabled apps installed on the device also appear on the CarPlay home screen.

Hardware 
While most of the CarPlay software runs on the connected iPhone, the CarPlay interface provides the audio and display connection to the car's infotainment system. CarPlay adapts to various display sizes and control interfaces for each vehicle: touch screen, rotary dials, buttons, steering-wheel controls and hands-free microphones. 

Aftermarket head units may support CarPlay and/or Android Auto. Aftermarket head units can be purchased from Alpine, Clarion, Kenwood, Pioneer, Sony and JVC.

The iPhone can connect to the car through a USB cable or wirelessly in two ways: by exchanging network credentials with a supporting CarPlay receiver over Bluetooth, establishing a two-way Wi-Fi connection; or by using a dongle adapter to enable a wireless connection to the system's USB port.

Manufacturers
Most major automakers offer vehicles with CarPlay. Manufacturers with no CarPlay models include Wuling and Tesla Motors.

Honda offers CarPlay on the Gold Wing motorcycle and on the Africa Twin.

History

Predecessor
By 2008, a year after iPhone introduction [2009 model year for America], Mercedes vehicles were first to sell an audio system incorporating both the [iPod and iPhone] and were equipped with 30 pin iOS input jacks. The new 2008 Harman Kardon NTG 2.5 featured full audio streaming, syncing, charging and control integrated into the steering wheel controls, instrument panel and head unit. Apple was working with Mercedes to develop iOS compatible audio systems into their cars first only a year after iPhone launch. With an Apple Lightning to 30 Pin adapter, iPhones/iPods remain backwards compatible with the Harman Kardon 2.5 and later models. This is the earliest audio system sold specifically engineered for iPod/iPhone integration, which predated CarPlay and every other manufacturer incorporating iOS into vehicles.  

The concept of CarPlay was based on the iOS 4 feature called "iPod Out" which was produced through several years of joint development by Apple and the BMW Group's Technology Office USA. iPod Out enabled vehicles with the necessary infrastructure to "host" the analog video and audio from a supporting iOS device while receiving inputs, such as button presses and knob rotations, from a car's infotainment system, to drive the "hosted" user interface in the vehicle's built-in display. It was announced at WWDC 2010 and first shipped in BMW Group vehicles in early 2011. The BMW and Mini option was called "PlugIn" and paved the way for the first cross-OEM platforms, introducing the concept of requiring a car-specific interface for apps (as opposed to MirrorLink's simple and insufficient mirroring of what was shown on the smartphone's screen).

Development
CarPlay's codename was Stark. Apple's Eddy Cue announced it as iOS in the Car at WWDC 2013. In January 2014 it was reported that Apple's hardware-oriented corporate culture had led to release delays. iOS in the Car was then rebranded and launched as "CarPlay" at the Geneva Motor Show in March 2014 with Ferrari, Mercedes-Benz, and Volvo among the first car manufacturers.

In 2022, Apple teased the next generation of CarPlay, which extends the user interface across multiple screens in the vehicle.

Features by iOS version

iOS 9 
iOS 9 added the ability to link car and iPhone wirelessly, not just a wired USB connector. It also allowed vehicle manufacturers to load apps which allow a user to control vehicle-specific features such as climate controls or radio via CarPlay.

iOS 10 
iOS 10's Messages app allows the user to listen to new messages and reply using dictation in an audio-only interface.

iOS 12 
iOS 12 added turn-by-turn guidance, including searching for points of interests and navigating to a destination, as well as support for third-party navigation apps like Google Maps or Waze.

iOS 13 
iOS 13 added Dashboard, an alternative to the app home screen, which presents a split layout of maps, media information, Calendar, or Siri Suggestions. It also added Calendar to the home screen, allowing suggested events to link towards map directions to the event location. A new Settings app enabled users to configure certain CarPlay specific settings, such as switching between light and dark modes, adjusting album art in CarPlay’s Now Playing screen, or enabling Do Not Disturb While Driving while in a CarPlay session. Third-party maps may also be displayed on Dashboard starting with iOS 13.4. It also added Apple's News app.

iOS 14 
iOS 14 added new preset wallpapers and the ability to run food ordering and parking services apps.

iOS 15 
iOS 15 brought improvements to Apple Maps and Focus modes, allowing users to customize (prioritize or postpone) notification delivery, particularly while driving.

iOS 16 
iOS 16 removed the confirmation process in sending a message, as well as in an update scheduled for late 2023, CarPlay will be able to connect to a car's internal systems to show the car's information on every screen available, including the gauge cluster.

Adoption 
June 2013: BMW officials announced their cars would not support CarPlay; they later changed their minds.

November 2013: Siri Eyes Free mode was offered as a dealer-installed accessory in the US to some Honda Accord and Acura RDX & ILX models. In December, Honda offered additional integration, featuring new HondaLink services, on some US and Canada models of the Civic and the Fit.

September 2014: A Ferrari FF was the first car with a full version of CarPlay. 

November 2014: Hyundai announced the Sonata sedan will be available with CarPlay by the end of the first quarter of 2015.

December 2015: Volvo implemented CarPlay in the 2016 XC90.

January 2016: Apple released a list detailing the car models which support CarPlay.

April 2017: The new generation Scania range became the first heavy duty truck in Europe to support CarPlay.

July 2017: The new Volvo VNL became the first heavy duty truck in the United States to support CarPlay.

October 2017: The 2018 Honda Gold Wing became the first motorcycle to support CarPlay.

January 2018: The 2019 Toyota Avalon became the first Toyota model with Apple CarPlay.

July 2018: Mazda added CarPlay support to vehicles newer than 2013 and equipped with the MZD-Connect system.

August 2018: Harley-Davidson CarPlay support was added to 2019 Touring models equipped with Boom! Box GTS radio.

December 2019: BMW no longer requires a subscription to use CarPlay.

Competition
The Open Automotive Alliance's Android Auto is a similar implementation used for Android devices.

Some vehicle manufacturers have their own systems for syncing the car with smartphones, for example: BMW ConnectedDrive,  NissanConnect, Hyundai Blue Link, iLane, MyFord Touch, Ford SYNC, OnStar, and Toyota Entune.

General Motors has released an API to allow the development of apps which interact with vehicle software systems.

MirrorLink is a standard for car-smartphone connectivity, currently implemented in vehicles by Honda, Volkswagen, SEAT, Buick, Skoda, Mercedes-Benz, Citroën, and Smart with phones by multiple manufacturers including Apple, HTC, Sony,  and Samsung.

Baidu CarLife is an automotive infotainment platform for iOS and Android for the Chinese market.

References

External links

Apple Inc. software
Automotive technology tradenames
Dashboard head units
IOS software
Natural language processing software
SRI International software
Virtual assistants